In Treatment is an Italian TV series directed by Saverio Costanzo and starring Sergio Castellitto.

Cast 
The actors appearing in the first season are:

 Sergio Castellitto as Giovanni Mari: a psychologist in his 50s
 Kasia Smutniak as Sara: Giovanni's patient on Monday
 Guido Caprino as Dario: Giovanni's patient on Tuesday
 Irene Casagrande as Alice: Giovanni's patient on Wednesday
 Barbora Bobuľová as Lea: Giovanni's patient on Thursday and Pietro's wife
 Adriano Giannini as Pietro: Giovanni's patient on Thursday and Lea's husband 
 Licia Maglietta as Anna: Giovanni's supervisor and former teacher
 Valeria Golino as Eleonora: Giovanni's wife
 Valeria Bruni Tedeschi as Irene: Alice's mother

References

External links 
 

2013 Italian television series debuts
2017 Italian television series endings
Sky Atlantic (Italy) television programmes